The Treaty of Worms was a political alliance formed between Great Britain, Austria and the Kingdom of Sardinia, signed on 13 September 1743, during the War of the Austrian Succession.

It was an ambitious piece of foreign policy on the part of the British government which sought to split the Emperor Charles VII, prince-elector of Bavaria, from French influence, whilst simultaneously resolving the differences between the Emperor, Queen Maria Theresa of Hungary and King Charles Emmanuel III of Sardinia.

Contents of the treaty 
Under the terms of the treaty, Maria Theresa agreed to transfer to the King of Sardinia the city and part of the duchy of Piacenza, the Vigevanesco, part of the duchy of Pavia, part of the county of Anghiera which lay to the west of Lake Maggiore, and claims to the marquisate of Finale. She also engaged to maintain 30,000 men in Italy, to be commanded by Savoy-Sardinia.

Great Britain agreed to pay the sum of £300,000 for the ceding of Finale, and to furnish an annual subsidy of £200,000, on the condition that Savoy-Sardinia should employ 45,000 men. In addition to this fiscal arrangement, Britain agreed to send a fleet into the Mediterranean.

Under a separate, secret convention, agreed contemporaneously with the Treaty, but which was neither formally ratified nor publicly acknowledged, it was stipulated that Britain would pay Maria Theresa an annual subsidy of £300,000, for as long "as the necessity of her affairs should require."

The terms of the Treaty of Worms relative to the ceding of the marquisate of Finale to Savoy-Sardinia were particularly unjust to the Genoese, since the territory had been guaranteed to them by the fourth article of the Quadruple Alliance of 2 August 1718 between Britain, France, Austria, and the Netherlands.

Criticism
The Treaty of Worms was presented to the Commons on 9 January 1744, and was considered in the entire house on 1 February 1744.

William Pitt
William Pitt, 1st Earl of Chatham, speaking in the House of Commons on 1 December 1743 roundly condemned the Treaty in the following statement which occurred during the course of an address of thanks he was giving after the Battle of Dettingen:

Thomas Carlyle
Thomas Carlyle had this to say on the terms of the treaty:

See also
List of treaties

References

Worms, 1743
1743 in Austria
1743 in Italy
1743 in Great Britain
1743 treaties
Worms, 1743
Worms, 1743
1743 in the Kingdom of Sardinia
Great Britain–Habsburg monarchy relations
Great Britain–Kingdom of Sardinia relations
Habsburg monarchy–Kingdom of Sardinia relations